Jay Prakash Gupta, also referred to as Jay Prakash Anand or popularly JP Gupta, is a Nepalese politician and former member of the Madhesi Jana Adhikar Forum, Nepal(Republican) party. He born in Saptari District, Nepal. Before joining forum, he was a member of Nepali Congress. His political career was going very well from this party but he left the party during Madhesh movement. He is presently running Terai Madhesh Rastriya Abhiyan.

Political career 
Gupta, once an influential leader of a time in Nepali Congress left the party claiming the party was not seriously listening to voice and demand of madhesh during the Madhesh Movement. He was not the alone to do so. Infleuential leaders including Mahantha Thakur, Bijay Kumar Gachhadar and Sarad Singh Bhandari had also left the party with similar voice. After this, he joined Madheshi Janadhikar Forum. Due to difference in political vision, the party was divided and hence Gupta joined Madheshi Janadhikar Forum(Republican).

Gupta had won 1994 and 1999 election from Saptari-1 from Nepali Congress ticket and was once an influential leader of the party and area. In 2008, he won in the First Constituent Assembly Election and became a CA member. Following this, he became Minister  for Agriculture and Cooperatives in the first Dahal Cabinet as a part of agreement between forum and CPN(Maoist).

He had previously been sworn five times as Minister between 2054 and 2059, once as state minister and four times as cabinet minister as Minister for Communication and Information. While he was in Baburam Bhattarai cabinet, he was proven accused in the case of abuse of authority and had to stay in jail for 18 months. This is the single case in Nepal when a sitting minister was jailed. At various point of time, he said it was as per a plan to destroy his political career by some people who were unhappy with his steps and were jealous of his achievements.After about 13 months of life in prison, he got released on 21 February 2012.

Presently, he seems to be away from active politics but he is active in his political mission of his own and keeps on visiting villages, knowing experiences and problems of people. He is presently running Terai Madhesh Rastriya Abhiyan. He's not seen much publicly these days and specially after 2015. He was expected to contest elections from his own party but he didn't in 2017 and it still remains controversial why he is so silent.

Published books 
"अख्तियारको थुना"(English-Akhtiyako thuna) by Jay Prakash Gupta.

Electoral history 
Except the 1991 election, Gupta remained victorious in every election he gave candidacy. Still he couldn't contest 2013 elections as he was in jail. On the other-hand, surprisingly he even didn't contest 2017 election though he was expected to contest.

Election in 2000s

2008 Constituent Assembly election

Election in the 1990s

1999 legislative elections

1994 legislative elections

1991 legislative elections

References 

Nepali Congress politicians from Madhesh Province
Government ministers of Nepal
People from Saptari District
Living people
Nepal MPs 1994–1999
Nepal MPs 1999–2002
Nepalese prisoners and detainees
Year of birth missing (living people)
Members of the 1st Nepalese Constituent Assembly